Pandora's Box is a compilation album, released on November 19, 1991, by Aerosmith. Issued by Columbia Records to capitalize on the band's newfound success with Geffen, the box set consists of three discs that cover Aerosmith's output from the 1970s and early 1980s. Alongside alternate versions, previously unreleased songs, live renditions and remixes, Pandora's Box features previously released studio material.

The original issue was as a long cardboard box, containing three CDs (each in its own jewel-case, with inserts) and a booklet that detailed the tracks and had comments from the band members. Later issues did away with the outer box, utilizing a cardboard slipcase, but reproduced the booklet in 'CD-size'.

The cover version of "Helter Skelter" is Aerosmith's third commercially released Beatles cover (after "Come Together"  from the Sgt. Pepper's Lonely Hearts Club Band soundtrack and "I'm Down" from Permanent Vacation), despite being the first they recorded.

Track listing

Recording locations
"When I Needed You" - Recorded at CBS Studios, New York City, New York, 10/5/66
"Major Barbara" - Recorded at Power Station, New York City, New York, May 20, 1971
"On the Road Again" - Recorded at Intermedia Sound, 5/8/72
"Dream On" - Recorded at Intermedia Studios, Boston, Massachusetts, 1972
"Make It" - Recorded at Intermedia Studios, Boston, Massachusetts, 1972
"Mama Kin" - Recorded at Intermedia Studios, Boston, Massachusetts, 1972
"Movin' Out" - Recorded at Intermedia Studios, Boston, Massachusetts, 1972
"One Way Street" - Recorded at Intermedia Studios, Boston, Massachusetts, 1972
"Rattlesnake Shake" - Recorded at Counterpart Studios, Cincinnati, September 26, 1973
"Walkin' the Dog" - Recorded at Counterpart studios, Cincinnati, September 26, 1973
"Pandora's Box" - Recorded at Record Plant Studios, New York City, New York, between 12/17/73 and 1/14/74
"Same Old Song and Dance" - Recorded at Record Plant Studios, New York City, New York, between 12/17/73 and 1/14/74
"Seasons of Wither" - Recorded at Record Plant Studios, New York City, New York, between 12/17/73 and 1/14/74
"Train Kept A-Rollin'" - Recorded at Record Plant Studios, New York City, New York, between 12/17/73 and 1/14/74
"Helter Skelter" - Recorded at Great Northern Recording Studios, 1975
"No More No More" - Recorded at Record Plant Studios, New York City, New York, February, 1975
"Round and Round" - Recorded at Record Plant Studios, New York City, New York, February, 1975
"Soul Saver" - Recorded at Record Plant Studios, New York City, New York, February, 1975
"Sweet Emotion" - Recorded at Record Plant Studios, New York City, New York, February, 1975
"Toys in the Attic" - Recorded at Record Plant Studios, New York City, New York, February, 1975
"Walk This Way" - Recorded at Record Plant Studios, New York City, New York, February, 1975
"You See Me Crying" - Recorded at Record Plant Studios, New York City, New York, February, 1975
"Back in the Saddle" - Recorded at the Wherehouse, Waltham, Mass. & Record Plant Studios, New York City, New York, Feb-March 1976
"Last Child" - Recorded at the Wherehouse, Waltham, Mass. & Record Plant Studios, New York City, New York, Feb-March, 1976
"Lick and a Promise" - Recorded at the Wherehouse, Waltham, Massachusetts & Record Plant Studios, New York City, New York, Feb-March, 1976
"Nobody's Fault" - Recorded at the Wherehouse, Waltham, Massachusetts & Record Plant Studios, New York City, New York, Feb-March, 1976
"Rats in the Cellar" - Recorded at the Wherehouse, Waltham, Mass. & Record Plant Studios, New York City, New York, Feb-March, 1976
"Write Me a Letter" - Recorded on tour in Boston, Massachusetts, November 1976
"Krawitham" - Recorded at the Cenacle, Armonk, New York, 5/2/77
"Circle Jerk" - Recorded at the Cenacle, Armonk, New York, & Record Plant Studios, NYC, June-Oct., 1977 (?)
"Critical Mass" - Recorded at the Cenacle, Armonk, New York, & Record Plant Studios, NYC, June-Oct., 1977
"Draw the Line" - Recorded at the Cenacle, Armonk, NY, & Record Plant Studios, New York City, New York, June-Oct., 1977
"Milkcow Blues" - Recorded at the Cenacle, Armonk, New York, & Record Plant Studios, New York City, New York, June-Oct., 1977
"Kings and Queens" - Recorded live on tour in Boston, Massachusetts, 3/28/78
"Chip Away the Stone" - Recorded at Long View Farm, North Brookfield, Massachusetts, June 4, 1978
"I Wanna Know Why" - Recorded on tour at the Cotton Bowl, Dallas, Texas, 7/4/78
"Lord of the Thighs" - Recorded on tour at the Cottonbowl, Dallas, Texas, 7/4/78
"Downtown Charlie" -  Recorded at The Record Plant, New York City, New York, 8/19/78
"Come Together" - Recorded at the Wherehouse, Waltham, Massachusetts, 8/21/78
"I Live in Connecticut" - Recorded at The Wherehouse, Waltham, Massachusetts, 3/10/79
"Let It Slide" - Recorded at Mediasound, New York City, New York, March, 1979
"Shit House Shuffle" - Recorded at Mediasound, New York City, New York, 5/30/79
"Three Mile Smile" - Recorded at Mediasound and Record Plant Studios, New York City, New York, 7/10/79
"Cheese Cake" - Recorded at Mediasound and Record Plant Studios, New York City, New York, May-Aug., 1979
"No Surprize" - Recorded at Mediasound and Record Plant Studios, New York City, New York, May-Aug., 1979
"Sharpshooter" - Recorded at Axis Studios, Atlanta, Georgia, 1980–81
"Riff & Roll" - Recorded at Power Station, New York City, New York, 9/16/81
"South Station Blues" - Recorded at Boston Opera House and Wherehouse, Waltham, Massachusetts, 1981
"Jailbait" - Recorded at Power Station, NYC & Criteria Studios, Miami, Florida, 1982

Reception
"Pandora's Box has 31 previously released songs and 21 live cuts, alternate takes and rarities," noted Mat Snow in Q. "Will this latter stuff be made separately available for the fan doesn't fancy shelling out for tracks already owned? Probably not… Despite high times aplenty, Pandora's Box is a career overview which offers a patchy, expensive introduction to the newcomer, and falls irritatingly between the stools of rarities collection and definitive compilation."

See also
 Pandora's Toys

Charts

Certification

Release history

References

External links
Aerosmith official website
3-CD List of Songs in Pandora's Box, with information about authors, order, and recording area

1991 compilation albums
Aerosmith compilation albums
Columbia Records compilation albums